The Inauguration of Elpidio Quirino as the sixth president of the Philippines took place on December 30, 1949, at the Independence Grandstand in Manila. The inauguration marked the commencement of the second term (and only full four-year term) of Elpidio Quirino as president and the first four-year term of Fernando Lopez as Vice President.

1949 in the Philippines
Presidency of Elpidio Quirino
Quirino, Elpidio